Dušan is a Slavic given name primarily used  in countries of Yugoslavia; and among Slovaks and Czechs. The name is derived from the Slavic noun duša "soul".

Occurrence 

In Serbia, it was the 29th most popular name for males, as of 2010.

People
Stefan Uroš IV Dušan, Emperor of the Serbian Empire
Dušan Bajević, Serbian footballer and football manager
Dušan Bařica, Czech ice hockey player
Dušan Basta, Serbian footballer
Dušan Bogdanović, Serbian-born American composer and classical guitarist
Dusan Djuric, Swedish international footballer of Serbian descent
Dušan Domović Bulut, Serbian 3x3 basketball player
Dušan Džamonja, Croatian sculptor
Dušan Fitzel, Slovak footballer and football manager
Dušan Galis, Slovak footballer and football manager
Dušan Kalmančok, Slovak astronomer
Dušan Kerkez, Serb footballer
Dušan Kovačević, Serbian playwright
Dušan Lajović, Serbian tennis player
Dušan Mandić, Serbian water polo player, Olympic champion
Dušan Matić, Serbian poet
Dušan Makavejev, Serbian film director
Dušan Mihajlović, Serbian politician
Dušan Mihajlović, Serbian footballer
Dušan Otašević, Serbian painter and sculptor
Dušan Pašek, Slovak ice hockey player
Dušan Petković (footballer born 1974), Serbian former footballer
Dušan Petković (footballer born 1903) (1903–1979), Serbian and Yugoslav football forward
Dušan Petronijević, Serbian footballer
Dušan Pirjevec, Slovenian literary historian, philosopher and resistance fighter
Dušan Popović, several people
Dušan Radović, Serbian journalist and writer
Dušan Repovš, Slovenian mathematician
Dušan Ristanović, Serbian biophysicists
Dušan Salfický, Czech ice hockey player
Dušan Šestić, Bosnian musician, composer of the Bosnian national anthem
Dušan Slobodník, Slovak literary theoretician, translator and politician
Dušan Švantner, Slovak politician
Dušan Tadić, Serbian footballer
Dušan Třeštík, Czech historian 
Dušan Uhrin, Slovak footballer and football manager
Dušan Vemić, Serbian tennis player
Dušan Vlahović, Serbian footballer
Dušan Uhrin Jr , Slovak football manager and the Son of Dušan Uhrin

See also
Cities:
Dušanovo (disambiguation)
Dushanbe

References

Slavic masculine given names
Bosnian masculine given names
Serbian masculine given names
Slovak masculine given names
Slovene masculine given names
Macedonian masculine given names
Montenegrin masculine given names
Czech masculine given names
Croatian masculine given names